Derek Ross King MBE (born 21 February 1962) is a Scottish television presenter, actor and writer, best known for being the LA Correspondent for ITV Breakfast programmes Lorraine and Good Morning Britain. King was honoured in the 2018 New Year Honours by being appointed an MBE for services in Broadcasting, Arts and Charity.

Life
King made his first stage appearance in 1966 at the age of four. At the age of 17 he appeared on Radio Clyde, presenting the Saturday morning flagship, "King's Clyde Countdown" and “The Lunchtime Show”. Two years later he made his television debut. King presented Young Krypton in 1988 on CITV, a show based on The Krypton Factor, aimed toward younger audiences.

From 1993 to 2010, King was the LA correspondent on GMTV. From September 2010 onwards, he is the LA correspondent for GMTV's replacement shows Daybreak and Lorraine. When Daybreak was replaced by Good Morning Britain in 2014, King continued his role as LA correspondent. After moving to Los Angeles in 2000, he secured roles in a film with Steven Seagal and in the 2004 release The Day After Tomorrow before entering a reality TV competition run by local television station KTLA to find a new weather presenter. There were 5000 entrants to the competition, but King won and was offered a five-year contract. However, King did not want to commit to being a weather presenter for that length of time and agreed to present the weather for a year before becoming KTLA's entertainment anchor.

King has been on national American television hosting The Hollywood Christmas Parade and The Critics' Choice Movie Awards Red Carpet for VH1. For five years, King was the entertainment anchor on KTLA/The CW Channel 5's Prime News, winning four Emmys and a Golden Mic award. He is also seen on Australia's Channel 9.

King's film credits include The Day After Tomorrow, Half Past Dead, Cruel Game, Do It For Uncle Manny, Abruptio, and Trust Me in which he played US talk show host Ray Lunge. He played himself in the movies Young Hercules and Who's Your Caddy. He voiced the role of Jinkins in Star Wars Jedi Fighter 2 for Lucas Arts and hosted for British TV, ITV's This Morning and Living TV specials on Will and Grace, CSI, According to Jim and Charmed. Before leaving London, he played one of the leading roles in Dick Whittington which was London's musical for the new millennium at Sadler's Wells Theatre in London's West End. This production was directed by Gillian Lynne (Cats and Phantom of the Opera) and was nominated for a prestigious Laurence Olivier Award.

King played Frank n Furter in The Rocky Horror Show and starred in and hosted 'Night of the Stars' at London's world-famous Palladium Theatre. He also created the role of Wallace in the musical Summer Holiday from the world premiere in Blackpool through the national tour to London's Apollo Theatre. Other theatre includes lead roles in Charley's Aunt, Joseph and the Amazing Technicolor Dreamcoat, Butterfly Children and Guys and Dolls.

King has appeared on Holiday, The Ross King Show, Hot Chefs, The 8.15 from Manchester, King of the Road, Quiz Night, and Pebble Mill.

On radio, he has hosted radio shows, including London's Capital Radio, and the Euro Chart for the UK. On BBC's National Radio 5 he hosted different shows including Fantasy Football and received another Sony Award for coverage of the Olympic Games. On the UK's national Talk Radio, he hosted OK to Talk and Ross King's Sports Stars. He also achieved a lifelong ambition co-hosting the American Weekly Top 40 countdown alongside the DJ Rick Dees. He was awarded an MBE in the 2018 New Year Honours List.

References

External links

Living people
1962 births
Scottish male film actors
Scottish male stage actors
BBC Radio 5 Live presenters
Scottish game show hosts
GMTV presenters and reporters
ITV Breakfast presenters and reporters
Members of the Order of the British Empire
Weather presenters
Scottish expatriates in the United States